Tamás Kiss (born 9 May 1987 in Ajka) is a Hungarian sprint canoer and marathon canoeist who has competed since the late 2000s. At the 2008 Summer Olympics in Beijing, he won a bronze medal in the C-2 1000 m event with teammate György Kozmann.

Kiss was a last-minute replacement in the Hungarian team for the 2008 Olympics after the death of two-time Olympic champion György Kolonics. He teamed up with Kolonics's former partner György Kozmann a mere one month before the games, and in Beijing, exceeding expectations, the pair finished in third place in the C-2 1000 m final.

Awards and honours

Orders and special awards
  Cross of Merit of the Republic of Hungary – Gold Cross (2008)

External links
Sports-reference.com profile

1987 births
Canoeists at the 2008 Summer Olympics
Living people
Hungarian male canoeists
Olympic canoeists of Hungary
Olympic bronze medalists for Hungary
Olympic medalists in canoeing
Medalists at the 2008 Summer Olympics
Sportspeople from Veszprém County
European Games competitors for Hungary
Canoeists at the 2019 European Games
Universiade medalists in canoeing
Universiade gold medalists for Hungary
Medalists at the 2013 Summer Universiade
20th-century Hungarian people
21st-century Hungarian people